MKI67 FHA domain-interacting nucleolar phosphoprotein is a protein that in humans is encoded by the MKI67IP gene.

MKI67 FHA domain-interacting nucleolar phosphoprotein contains an RNA recognition motif (RRM) near to the N-terminus and a FHA Ki67 binding domain near to the C-terminus. There are two conserved sequence motifs within the FHA Ki67 binding domain: TPVCTP and LERRKS, this domain binds to the forkhead-associated domain of human Ki67. High-affinity binding requires sequential phosphorylation by two kinases, CDK1 and GSK3, yielding pThr238, pThr234 and pSer230. This interaction is involved in cell cycle regulation.

References

Further reading

External links 
 PDBe-KB provides an overview of all the structure information available in the PDB for Human MKI67 FHA domain-interacting nucleolar phosphoprotein (MKI67IP)

Protein domains